is a professional Japanese baseball player. He plays pitcher for the Chiba Lotte Marines.

References 

1998 births
Living people
Baseball people from Aomori Prefecture
Nippon Professional Baseball pitchers
Chiba Lotte Marines players
Auckland Tuatara players
Japanese expatriate baseball players in New Zealand